Acacia argyrophylla, known colloquially as silver mulga, is a species of Acacia native to South Australia.

Description
The branchlets have bright greenish yellow hairs with white hairs on the penultimate branchlets. The shrub produces racemose inflorescences that have a  axis covered in dense, appressed, greenish golden hairs containing 25 to 45 flowers per head . The pods are often rough and warty and raised over the seeds.

Taxonomy
The species was first formally described by the botanist William Jackson Hooker in 1848 as part of the work Botanical Magazine. The species was reclassified as Racosperma argyrophyllum by Leslie Pedley in 2003 and returned to the genus Acacia in 2006. The other synonyms are Acacia bombycina and Acacia brachybotrya var. argyrophylla. The specific epithet is taken from the ancient Greek words argyros (ἄργυρος) meaning silver and  phyllon (φύλλον) meaning leaf, in reference to the silvery coloured foliage.

Distribution
It is found only in South Australia from around Hawker in the Flinders Ranges in the north, extending south to around Monarto. Other populations are found on the Yorke Peninsula and around Onkaparinga Gorge. It often situated on slopes and low hills as part of open woodland and mallee communities.

See also
 List of Acacia species

References

argyrophylla
Fabales of Australia
Flora of South Australia
Taxa named by William Jackson Hooker
Plants described in 1848